Analisoma is a genus of bird in the family Campephagidae recognized in some taxonomies. Many taxonomists consider this genus conspecific with the genus Edolisoma. 
It contains the following species:
 New Caledonian cuckooshrike (Analisoma analis)
 White-winged cuckooshrike (Analisoma ostenta)
 Blackish cuckooshrike (Analisoma coerulescens)

References

Bird genera
Campephagidae